Jerzy Pilch (10 August 1952 – 29 May 2020) was a Polish writer, columnist, and journalist. Critics have compared Pilch's style to Witold Gombrowicz, Milan Kundera, or Bohumil Hrabal.

Early life and education

Born and raised in the small town of Wisła in the Beskids in southern Poland, Pilch studied Polish philology at the Jagiellonian University in Kraków and became active in the city's underground literary scene in the late 1970s. He began making his name under the martial law in the 1980s, by writing and reading essays for the "spoken magazine" Na Głos ("Out loud"), a regular spoken-word event organised by the oppositional Klub Inteligencji Katolickiej ("Club of Polish Catholic Intellectuals") (even though Pilch himself was Lutheran).

Career 
In 1989, Pilch began to contribute popular satirical essays for the Kraków-based liberal Catholic weekly Tygodnik Powszechny, which established him as a public intellectual. Pilch's best essays from his column in Tygodnik Powszechny appeared in three collections entitled Rozpacz z powodu utraty furmanki ("Despair caused by the loss of a wagon", 1994), Tezy o głupocie, piciu i umieraniu ("Theses On Stupidity, Drinking and Dying", 1995), and Bezpowrotnie utracona leworęczność ("The Irreversible Loss of Left-handedness", 1998).

Also in 1989, he was conferred the Kościelski Award for his debut novel Wyznania twórcy pokątnej literatury erotycznej ("Confessions of an Author of Illicit Erotic Literature"), an ironic insider's account of the Kraków art scene.

Pilch's second novel, Spis cudzołożnic ("List of Adulteresses", 1993), tells the story of a failed eccentric writer guiding a foreign guest on a tour of Kraków and through a curio collection of national myths and the absurd socialist realities of the 1980s. In 1995, actor Jerzy Stuhr made the novel into a film as his directing debut (under the international title List of Lovers).

The same year, Pilch published his third novel Inne rozkosze ("Other Pleasures"), the first to appear in English (as His Current Woman, 2002).

Pilch quit his work for Tygodnik Powszechny in 1999, left Kraków entirely, and settled in Warsaw, where he began to write a column for the weekly Polityka. A collection of texts from this series was published as Upadek człowieka pod Dworcem Centralnym ("The Fall of Man in Front of the Central Station") in 2002.

Pilch's most successful book so far is his fourth novel Pod Mocnym Aniołem ("The Mighty Angel", 2000), a satirical take on the "drinking novel" genre, which was awarded a Nike Award, the prestigious Polish literary award, the following year. In 2009, it was translated into English as The Mighty Angel, and in 2010, Tysiąc spokojnych miast was also translated as A Thousand Peaceful Cities.

Several of Pilch's books have been translated into Bulgarian, Dutch, English, Estonian, French, Lithuanian, Russian, Slovak, and Spanish.

Death 
Pilch died on 29 May 2020 from complications from Parkinson's disease.

Books
1988: Wyznania twórcy pokątnej literatury erotycznej, Kraków: Wydawnictwo Literackie.  ("Confessions of an author of illicit erotic literature")
1993: Spis cudzołożnic. Proza podróżna, Kraków: Wydawnictwo Literackie.  ("List of adulteresses. Travel prose"; screen version under the international title List of Lovers, 1995).
1994: Rozpacz z powodu utraty furmanki, Kraków: Wydawnictwo Literackie.  ("Despair caused by the loss of a wagon")
1995: Inne rozkosze, Kraków: Wydawnictwo "a5".  ("Other pleasures"; translated as His Current Woman, Evanston, Ill.: Northwestern University Press/Hydra Books 2002).
1996: Monolog z lisiej jamy, Kraków: Universitas.  ("Monologue from a foxhole")
1997: Tezy o głupocie, piciu i umieraniu, Kraków: Wydawnictwo Literackie.  ("Theses on stupidity, drinking and dying")
1997: Tysiąc spokojnych miast, Kraków: Wydawnictwo Literackie.  ("Thousand silent cities"; translated as A Thousand Peaceful Cities, Rochester, NY: Open Letter Books 2010).
1998: Bezpowrotnie utracona leworęczność, Kraków: Wydawnictwo Literackie.  ("The irreversible loss of left-handedness")
2000 (with Olga Tokarczuk and Andrzej Stasiuk): Opowieści wigilijne, Wałbrzych: Ruta.  ("Christmas tales")
2000: Pod Mocnym Aniołem, Kraków: Wydawnictwo Literackie.  ("The Strong Angel Inn"; translated as The Mighty Angel, Rochester, NY: Open Letter Books 2009).
2004: Miasto utrapienia, Warszawa: Wydawnictwo Świat Książki.  ("City of Woe")
2004: Narty Ojca Świętego, Warszawa: Wydawnictwo Świat Książki.  ("The Holy Father's Skis")
2006: Moje pierwsze samobójstwo, Warszawa: Wydawnictwo Świat Książki.  ("My First Suicide")

See also 
Andrzej Stasiuk
Polish literature
List of Polish writers

References

External links
Review of The Holy Father's Skis in The Daily Telegraph
Jerzy Pilch at Culture.pl
Excerpt from His Current Woman at polishwriting.net
Jerzy Pilch at Open Letter Books
Excerpt from The Mighty Angel at Open Letter Books

1952 births
2020 deaths
Lutheran writers
Jagiellonian University alumni
Polish Lutherans
People from Wisła
Nike Award winners
20th-century Polish novelists
21st-century Polish novelists
International Writing Program alumni
Polish male novelists
20th-century Polish male writers
21st-century Polish male writers
Neurological disease deaths in Poland
Deaths from Parkinson's disease